The 1st Regiment Massachusetts Volunteer Infantry was an infantry regiment in the Union army during the American Civil War. It was the first regiment to leave Massachusetts for a three-year term (several had previously left for 90-day terms) in response to President Abraham Lincoln's May 3, 1861, call for three-year regiments. It was also the first three-year regiment from any state to reach Washington, D.C., for federal service. The core of the regiment was five companies from the 1st Massachusetts Volunteer Militia, a peace-time unit which was formed in 1858, replacing an earlier, disbanded unit of the same designation. Five companies of new recruits were added to the regiment and the unit was mustered in by companies beginning May 23, 1861, at Camp Cameron in Cambridge, Massachusetts.

After arriving in Washington, the regiment became part of Major General Irwin McDowell's Army of Northeastern Virginia and saw their first combat during the Battle of Blackburn's Ford. The 1st Massachusetts was engaged during the First Battle of Bull Run. When Union forces surrounding Washington were reorganized, the regiment became part of the Army of the Potomac, with which it was associated for the rest of its term of service. It was involved in the Peninsular Campaign and was present for virtually all of the major battles in which the Army of the Potomac fought, including the Second Battle of Bull Run, the Battle of Fredericksburg, the Battle of Chancellorsville, the Battle of Gettysburg and Lieutenant General Ulysses Grant's Overland Campaign.

Organization and early service
At the start of the war, with the firing on Fort Sumter, the 1st Massachusetts Volunteer Militia consisted of five companies based in and around Boston, Massachusetts. The peace-time unit of militia was organized in 1858 not long after an older unit of the same name disbanded. The five core companies were the "Union Guards" of East Boston (which became Company B), the "Roxbury City Guards" of Roxbury (which became Company D), the "Pulaski Guards" of South Boston (which became Company E), the "National Guards" of Boston (which became Company F), and the "Independent Boston Fusileers" (which became Company G). The commanding officer, Colonel Robert Cowdin, originally offered their service in response to Lincoln's first call for 75,000 volunteers to serve a term of 90-days. But as the unit did not yet have the ten companies required for a regiment, the request was set aside.

The regiment first made its headquarters at Faneuil Hall in Boston and began recruiting volunteers for five new companies. This progressed for about a month until a full complement of companies was reached. When Lincoln's call for three-year regiments was issued on May 3, 1861, the men of the 1st Massachusetts unanimously agreed to serve for that term. The first four companies were mustered into federal service on May 23 and the remaining six over the next few days. On May 25, the regiment was ordered to occupy an improvised training camp outside of Boston dubbed Camp Ellsworth. The barracks were located in an old ice house next to Fresh Pond in North Cambridge, Massachusetts. The regiment began active training and drilling here, however, the camp and barracks turned out to be unsuitable and unhealthy, resulting a growing sick list. On June 13, the unit moved to a different location in Cambridge where new barracks were constructed. This came to be known as Camp Cameron. Just two days later, the War Department summoned the regiment to active service.

The 1st Massachusetts left Boston by railroad cars on June 15, transferred to the steamship Commonwealth in Groton, Connecticut, disembarked in Jersey City and again transferred to a train bound for Washington. Since the Baltimore riot two months earlier when the 6th Massachusetts was attacked by a large crowd of civilian Confederate sympathizers, new Union regiments headed southward generally avoided passing through that city. Col. Cowdin decided to travel through Baltimore which required the regiment to march on foot between two of the city's train depots as the 6th Massachusetts had done. The men of the 1st Massachusetts were ordered to load their muskets before conducting the march. A large crowd of civilians assembled but remained silent as the 1st Massachusetts passed. After boarding train cars without incident, the regiment arrived in Washington on the evening of June 17. It was the first of the three-year regiments to reach the capital.

On June 19, the regiment marched through Washington and Georgetown and established a camp on the north side of the Potomac River which they called Camp Banks. The 1st Massachusetts spent nearly a month there, drilling and preparing for the upcoming campaign. They were attached to the Fourth Brigade (commanded by Col. Israel B. Richardson) of the First Division (commanded by Brigadier General Daniel Tyler) of Maj. Gen. Irwin McDowell's Army of Northeastern Virginia.

First Bull Run Campaign

On July 16, the regiment received orders to march with their brigade into Virginia as Gen. McDowell commenced to move his army to meet the Confederate forces gathered around the important railroad junction at Manassas, Virginia. The regiment crossed the Potomac via the Chain Bridge and marched the next two days until they reached the vicinity of Centreville, Virginia and camped there.

Battle of Blackburn's Ford

The next day, July 18, Tyler's division was ordered to probe the Confederate position on the other side of Bull Run. Richardson's brigade led the reconnaissance-in-force known as the Battle of Blackburn's Ford during which the 1st Massachusetts acted as the leading regiment of the brigade by Col. Cowdin's request. The 1st Massachusetts went into their first battle wearing their gray Massachusetts militia uniforms (the typical color for many state militia units). This caused considerable confusion for both Confederate and Union units that encountered the regiment. After they crossed Bull Run at Blackburn's Ford, three companies of the 1st Massachusetts were ordered forward as skirmishers to probe the Confederate position. These two companies took the brunt of the unit's casualties during the engagement, although the entire regiment was exposed to heavy fire. The 1st Massachusetts found that the Confederates were present in force on the other side of Blackburn's Ford and had a strong position. Tyler ordered a complete withdrawal. Any attempt to flank the Confederate position by Blackburn's Ford was thereafter lost. The 1st Massachusetts suffered casualties of 13 killed in action and 20 wounded and missing.

First Battle of Bull Run

Due to the failure of the reconnaissance at Blackburn's Ford, McDowell determined that a frontal assault on the Confederate lines across Bull Run would be necessary. The result was the First Battle of Bull Run fought on July 27. During the battle, the 1st Massachusetts and their brigade were posted at Blackburn's Ford to hold the crossing and to make demonstrations, or lightly engage, the forces on the other side of the ford to prevent them from reinforcing the rest of the Confederate line. The 1st Massachusetts, relatively sheltered in woods near the ford, waited for hours while the main action played out several miles to their northwest, upstream along Bull Run. When the main Union force retreated in extreme disorder, the Confederate troops at Blackburn's Ford advanced to attack. The 1st Massachusetts resisted this advance for a short time, returning fire. Soon, however, an order came for them to immediately retire. Having no knowledge of the general retreat, this order came as a surprise to the regiment. They marched northward towards Centreville but did not join in the general retreat. Instead they halted and bivouacked just in the rear of the artillery, buried their dead, and rested until orders came near midnight to march for Washington. Theirs was the last Union brigade to leave the field.

Peninsular Campaign

Ordered to Fortress Monroe, Va., April 7, 1862; thence to Yorktown. Siege of Yorktown April 16-May 4. Affair at Yorktown April 26 (Cos. "A," "H" and "I"). Battle of Williamsburg May 5. Battle of Fair Oaks, Seven Pines, May 31 – June 1. Seven days before Richmond June 25 – July 1. Battles of Oak Grove June 25; Savage Station June 29; White Oak Swamp and Glendale June 30; Malvern Hill July 1. At Harrison's Landing until August 15.

Northern Virginia Campaign and duty near Washington
Movement to Fortress Monroe, thence to Centreville August 15–26. Bristoe Station or Kettle Run August 27. Catlett's Station August 28. Battles of Groveton August 29 and Bull Run August 30. Duty in the Defences of Washington until December --. At Fort Lyon until September 13. Near Fairfax Seminary until October 20 and at Munson's Hill until November 1. Duty at Fairfax Station November 2–25. Operations on Orange & Alexandria Railroad November 10–12.

1863
"Mud March" January 20–24, 1863. At Falmouth until April 27. Operations at Rappahannock Bridge and Grove Church February 5-7. Chancellorsville Campaign April 27 – May 6. Battle of Chancellorsville May 1–5. Gettysburg (Pa.) Campaign June 11 – July 24. Battle of Gettysburg July 1–3. Pursuit of Lee until July 24. Moved to New York July 30 – August 1. Duty at Governor's Island Ricker's Island and David's Island, New York Harbor until October 15. Moved to Washington October 15 thence to Union Mills, Va., and rejoin Corps October 17. Advance to line of the Rappahannock November 7–8. Kelly's Ford November 7. Mine Run Campaign November 26-December 2. Payne's Farm November 27.

1864
 Duty near Brandy Station until May 1864. Demonstration on the Rapidan February 6–7. Rapidan Campaign May 3–20. Battles of the Wilderness May 5 7; Spottsylvania May 8–12; Spottsylvania Court House May 12–21. Assault on the Salient at Spottsylvania Court House May 12. Harris Farm or Fredericksburg Road May 19. Ordered home for muster out May 20 Veterans and Recruits transferred to 11th Massachusetts Infantry May 20. Mustered out May 25, 1864. Expiration of term.

Armament

Because the core of the regiment was an existing militia regiment, they already had stocks of Springfield Model 1855 rifled musket with which they equipped the new companies (some of which were the 1858 modification with simpler rear sight, a patch box on the side of the buttstock, and an iron nosecap). The 1855 Springfield was a .58 calibre Minié-type muzzle-loading fire-arm. It was issued with a square socket bayonet. The regiment did not use the Maynard tape primer in the field, but standard percussion caps.  The regiment used these rifles through its service.

Medal of Honor
 Nathaniel M. Allen At Gettysburg on 2 July, when his regiment was falling back, already carrying the national color, he returned in the face of the enemy's fire, pulled the regimental flag from under the body of its fallen bearer saving it from capture.

Casualties and total strength

Regiment lost during service 8 Officers and 134 Enlisted men killed and mortally wounded and 1 Officer and 78 Enlisted men by disease. Total 221.

See also 

 Massachusetts in the Civil War
 List of Massachusetts Civil War units

Notes

References

 
 .
 .
 
 
 

Units and formations of the Union Army from Massachusetts
1861 establishments in Massachusetts
Military units and formations established in 1861
Military units and formations disestablished in 1864